Max Früh is a small German specialist construction company mostly building bridges. It was established in 1908.

One of its flagship projects was the construction of the Pierre Pflimlin bridge over the Rhine south of Strasbourg in the early 2000s together with Bilfinger Berger.

References

External links
Max Früh (official website)

Construction and civil engineering companies of Germany
Construction and civil engineering companies established in 1908
German companies established in 1908